Thomas Wakem Caldwell (May 2, 1867 – March 14, 1937) was a farmer and political figure in New Brunswick, Canada. He represented Victoria—Carleton in the House of Commons of Canada from 1919 to 1925 as a United Farmers then Progressive Party Member of Parliament.

Biography
He was born in Florenceville, New Brunswick, the son of Andrew Cunningham Caldwell and Margaret Wakem, and, after completing his education, became a farmer there. Caldwell was married twice: to Annie Abeldt in 1892 and later to Melissa Haladay. He was president of the United Farmers of New Brunswick and served on the executive board of the Farmer's Co-operative Company of New Brunswick. Caldwell was first elected to the House of Commons in a 1919 by-election held after Frank Broadstreet Carvell was named chairman of the Board of Railway Commissioners. He was defeated when he ran for re-election in 1925. Caldwell went to England as a farm delegate to protest an embargo on Canadian potatoes. He died in Ottawa at the age of 69.

References

Members of the House of Commons of Canada from New Brunswick
Progressive Party of Canada MPs
1867 births
1937 deaths